Allegrini is a surname. Notable people with the surname include:

Agnese Allegrini (born 1982), Italian badminton player
Francesco Allegrini da Gubbio (1587–1663), Italian painter
Giacinto Allegrini (born 1989), Italian football player
Giuseppe Allegrini, Italian printer and engraver

it:Allegrini